Oregon Ballot Measure 91 was a 2014 ballot measure in the U.S. state of Oregon. Its passage legalized the "recreational use of marijuana, based on regulation and taxation to be determined by the Oregon Liquor Control Commission".

Measure 91 was the third initiative seeking to legalize marijuana for recreational use in Oregon; previous measures were 1986's Measure 5 and 2012's Measure 80 while medical use of marijuana was legalized in Oregon in 1998. Measure 91 passed by approximately 56% to 44%. Most polls leading up to the election showed majority support for legalizing recreational marijuana use among adults.

Implementation
Effective July 1, 2015 (per Section 82(1)) the measure legalizes the possession and use of marijuana for adults 21-years of age or older. Adults can carry up to one ounce of marijuana, keep up to eight ounces at home per household, and grow up to four plants per household.

Retail sales outlets will be licensed by the Oregon Liquor Control Commission, which must begin accepting applications on or before January 4, 2016.  Early sales started October 1, 2015 through existing medical marijuana dispensaries. Sales topped $11 million in the first week that recreational marijuana was legally available for sale in Oregon.

Fiscal impact
Estimates project that the initiative would generate between $17 million to $40 million per year in tax revenue. Potential cost savings for the state and local governments were noted though not explicitly identified in monetary terms due to uncertainty of the measure's full effects on marijuana-related convictions and fines.

Opponents and proponents

Opponents
In September 2014 the Oregon District Attorneys Association and Oregon State Sheriffs Association launched an organized opposition, Vote No on 91. Local opponents included The Oregon Pediatric Society, the Oregon chapter of the American Academy of Pediatrics, Medal of Honor recipient Robert D. Maxwell, state representatives John Huffman and Gene Whisnant, state senator Tim Knopp, the Oregon Republican Party, and others.

Proponents

 City Club of Portland
 Democratic Party of Oregon
 Earl Blumenauer, Democratic representative for Oregon's 3rd congressional district
 Jeff Merkley, Democratic Senator from Oregon
 New Approach Oregon
 Chief Petitioner Anthony Johnson
 Oregon State Council for Retired Citizens
 The Oregonian Editorial Board
 The Register-Guard Editorial Board

Polling

Results

Yes-votes on Ballot Measure 91 prevailed in 13 counties, including Multnomah County by a margin of over 40 percent. Likewise, no-votes on Ballot Measure 91 prevailed in 23 counties, although Josephine County barely rejected the measure by just two votes.

Source: Oregon State Elections Division

See also

 Cannabis in Oregon
 "Burnside Burn", an event held on Portland's Burnside Bridge the night the law went into effect
 Oregon Ballot Measure 67 (1998)

References

External links
 Oregon Legalized Marijuana Initiative, Measure 91 (2014) at Ballotpedia

2014 cannabis law reform
Cannabis ballot measures in the United States
Cannabis law in Oregon
2014 Oregon ballot measures